PAK'nSAVE (stylised PAK'nSAVE, originally PAK 'N SAVE) is a New Zealand discount food warehouse chain owned by the Foodstuffs cooperative. It is one of the three main supermarket chains, alongside Countdown and New World.

There are 56 stores across the country, including 17 in Auckland. The stores sell a range of produce, including meat, fish, bread, liquor and other groceries.

Stores are large and have a no frills environment, often with unlined interiors and concrete floors. Customers are left to pack their own bags, however (since 2019) plastic bags are no longer sold at checkout. Customers are instead expected to supply their own re-usable bags. Many stores offer boxes set on or under a large desk where customers can pack their groceries for easier convenience. From 2015, PAK'nSAVE was consistently the cheapest supermarket in New Zealand during several years of surveys.

History

The first store, styled "PAK 'N SAVE", opened in June 1985 at Kaitaia in the North Island.

In 2005, there were 37 stores around New Zealand, including seven in Auckland.

Operations

The name probably originates from the cost-saving practice of leaving customers to pack their own groceries, with checkout operators simply placing the products purchased back into a trolley.

Extra products that are not on shelves are stacked above the shelves on the pallets they were delivered in, meaning that the floor space can be used for retail and storage. The stores are supplied daily from their co-operative distributor Foodstuffs.

PAK'nSAVE stores often buys stock in bulk. This process means that stores don't offer a wide variety of brands and pack sizes as full-service supermarkets, with products often restricted to market leaders and store brands. A 2009 Consumer magazine survey noticed the lack of range especially in the pet food and toilet paper categories.

Most stores have self checkout and some have self scanning facilities where customers scan and bag their own groceries, with several self-checkouts monitored over by a single staff member for assistance and to clear any restricted transactions (e.g. alcohol). PAK'nSAVE has self-scanning facilities (Shop n' Go) where pre-registered customers can scan items with a hand-held scanner (PS20) while shopping in store.

PAK'nSAVE Mini

On 13 September 2017, Levin's Write Price supermarket was rebranded as PAK'nSAVE Mini.
PAK'nSAVE Mini is a small format store that stocks around 2,500 products. In comparison, standard PAK'nSAVE stores stock approximately 8,000 products.

Competition
PAK'nSAVE's main competitors are Countdown, owned by Woolworths NZ; and Foodstuffs' full-service supermarket, New World.

In the annual Consumer magazine survey of supermarket prices, PAK'nSAVE has been named the country's cheapest supermarket (either unanimously or by majority of centres surveyed) in all eleven surveys since the current survey methodology was adopted in 2003. The latest survey was conducted in May 2013, which was based on the purchase of forty common products, including food, non-alcoholic drinks, personal care and cleaning items (but excluding meat, fresh fruit and vegetables due to quality comparison issues and alcohol due to local licensing rules and heavy discounting practises). In the survey, PAK'nSAVE was named cheapest in six of the seven centres surveyed (north Auckland, south-east Auckland, Tauranga, Napier-Hastings, Christchurch and Dunedin), and was named second-cheapest in the remaining centre (Wellington) behind Countdown.

PAK'nSAVE also came out the cheapest supermarkets in the 2001 and 2002 Consumer magazine surveys. These surveys were paper surveys where prices on 140 items were recorded by surveyors visiting the supermarket and recording the shelf prices. However, the method was prone to supermarkets cheating by temporarily marking down shelf prices while the surveyor was in store, and the method was scrapped in 2003. Since then, the survey is conducted on only forty items, purchased by undercover surveyors through the checkouts and the prices taken from the till receipt, with the food purchased donated to local food banks.

Marketing
PAK'nSAVE is well known for its "cut price" television and print adverts utilising a stick figure, named "Stickman", in black on a yellow background (occasionally, the colour scheme is reversed, including during the 2011 Rugby World Cup and the 2012 Summer Olympics). The television adverts are voiced by comedian Paul Ego.

In 2011, the Stickman adverts were one of the finalists for Best Ad in the annual Fair Go Ad Awards, but ultimately lost (by landslide) to the New Zealand Lotteries Commission's "Wilson the Dog" adverts.

Fuel discounts
PAK'nSAVE offers fuel discounts to shoppers for spending a qualifying amount on shopping. PAK'nSAVE stores with on-site PAK'nSAVE fuel filling stations offer vouchers to use at these stations. Stores without on-site Pak'nSave fuel filling stations offer vouchers for use at Z Energy service stations.

Fuel sites
In December 2002, the first PAK'nSAVE fuel site was opened at the PAK'nSAVE in Tamatea. It was originally owned by BP New Zealand and Foodstuffs. More fuel sites were opened in more PAK'nSAVE stores and New World joined for the fuel sites later. In 2018, Z Energy won Mobil's contract to operate the fuel sites and fuel vouchers.

Fundraising and Charity 
In early 2023 PAK’nSAVE Owner Operators from across the North Island donated over $575,000 to help communities affected by Cyclone Gabrielle.

PAK’nSAVE stores donated the equivalent of 2.5 million meals in 2019 to those who needed them the most. 
The first ever PAK'canSAVE appeal saw nearly 80,000 cans donated to local food banks by generous customers, with PAK’nSAVE donating $200,000

In November 2015 PAK'nSAVE stores around New Zealand participated in the annual Movember fundraising effort, raising NZ$106,000 for Movember New Zealand. This was the largest sum ever raised by a New Zealand company for the charity.

References

External links

Supermarkets of New Zealand
Retail companies established in 1985
Discount stores
New Zealand companies established in 1985